The Krasnoarmeysky constituency (No.82) is a Russian legislative constituency in Volgograd Oblast. The constituency covers southern Volgograd as well as southern Volgograd Oblast.

Members elected

Election results

1993

|-
! colspan=2 style="background-color:#E9E9E9;text-align:left;vertical-align:top;" |Candidate
! style="background-color:#E9E9E9;text-align:left;vertical-align:top;" |Party
! style="background-color:#E9E9E9;text-align:right;" |Votes
! style="background-color:#E9E9E9;text-align:right;" |%
|-
|style="background-color:"|
|align=left|Vladimir Kosykh
|align=left|Independent
|
|16.84%
|-
| colspan="5" style="background-color:#E9E9E9;"|
|- style="font-weight:bold"
| colspan="3" style="text-align:left;" | Total
| 
| 100%
|-
| colspan="5" style="background-color:#E9E9E9;"|
|- style="font-weight:bold"
| colspan="4" |Source:
|
|}

1995

|-
! colspan=2 style="background-color:#E9E9E9;text-align:left;vertical-align:top;" |Candidate
! style="background-color:#E9E9E9;text-align:left;vertical-align:top;" |Party
! style="background-color:#E9E9E9;text-align:right;" |Votes
! style="background-color:#E9E9E9;text-align:right;" |%
|-
|style="background-color:"|
|align=left|Mikhail Tarantsov
|align=left|Communist Party
|
|24.22%
|-
|style="background-color:"|
|align=left|Aleksandr Karpenko
|align=left|Liberal Democratic Party
|
|9.37%
|-
|style="background-color:"|
|align=left|Vasily Khomutov
|align=left|Our Home – Russia
|
|8.99%
|-
|style="background-color:"|
|align=left|Valentina Burkina
|align=left|Yabloko
|
|7.29%
|-
|style="background-color:#DA2021"|
|align=left|Vladimir Kosykh (incumbent)
|align=left|Ivan Rybkin Bloc
|
|4.14%
|-
|style="background-color:#FE4801"|
|align=left|Vladimir Bush
|align=left|Pamfilova–Gurov–Lysenko
|
|3.99%
|-
|style="background-color:"|
|align=left|Nikolay Cherkasov
|align=left|Agrarian Party
|
|3.73%
|-
|style="background-color:#FF4400"|
|align=left|Lyudmila Ishunina
|align=left|Party of Workers' Self-Government
|
|3.71%
|-
|style="background-color:"|
|align=left|Aleksandr Losev
|align=left|Union of Patriots
|
|3.70%
|-
|style="background-color:"|
|align=left|Vladimir Yevtushenko
|align=left|Independent
|
|3.33%
|-
|style="background-color:#265BAB"|
|align=left|Sergey Nizhegorodov
|align=left|Russian Lawyers' Association
|
|3.20%
|-
|style="background-color:#1C1A0D"|
|align=left|Valentin Kantemirov
|align=left|Forward, Russia!
|
|3.07%
|-
|style="background-color:#D50000"|
|align=left|Vladimir Tibirkov
|align=left|Communists and Working Russia - for the Soviet Union
|
|2.39%
|-
|style="background-color:"|
|align=left|Renary Tarasov
|align=left|Power to the People
|
|1.84%
|-
|style="background-color:#2998D5"|
|align=left|Nadezhda Voloshenko
|align=left|Russian All-People's Movement
|
|1.81%
|-
|style="background-color:#F21A29"|
|align=left|Gennady Medentsov
|align=left|Trade Unions and Industrialists – Union of Labour
|
|1.56%
|-
|style="background-color:"|
|align=left|Vladimir Sabuk
|align=left|Independent
|
|1.31%
|-
|style="background-color:"|
|align=left|Vladimir Sidorov
|align=left|Russian Party
|
|0.97%
|-
|style="background-color:"|
|align=left|Yevgeny Chigrin
|align=left|Independent
|
|0.57%
|-
|style="background-color:"|
|align=left|Valery Bgashev
|align=left|Independent
|
|0.49%
|-
|style="background-color:#000000"|
|colspan=2 |against all
|
|8.23%
|-
| colspan="5" style="background-color:#E9E9E9;"|
|- style="font-weight:bold"
| colspan="3" style="text-align:left;" | Total
| 
| 100%
|-
| colspan="5" style="background-color:#E9E9E9;"|
|- style="font-weight:bold"
| colspan="4" |Source:
|
|}

1999

|-
! colspan=2 style="background-color:#E9E9E9;text-align:left;vertical-align:top;" |Candidate
! style="background-color:#E9E9E9;text-align:left;vertical-align:top;" |Party
! style="background-color:#E9E9E9;text-align:right;" |Votes
! style="background-color:#E9E9E9;text-align:right;" |%
|-
|style="background-color:"|
|align=left|Vasily Galushkin
|align=left|Independent
|
|40.00%
|-
|style="background-color:"|
|align=left|Mikhail Tarantsov (incumbent)
|align=left|Communist Party
|
|25.63%
|-
|style="background-color:"|
|align=left|Nikolay Serdyukov
|align=left|Independent
|
|17.92%
|-
|style="background-color:#084284"|
|align=left|Aleksandr Kononenko
|align=left|Spiritual Heritage
|
|1.33%
|-
|style="background-color:"|
|align=left|Valery Mokrenko
|align=left|Our Home – Russia
|
|1.18%
|-
|style="background-color:#000000"|
|colspan=2 |against all
|
|11.78%
|-
| colspan="5" style="background-color:#E9E9E9;"|
|- style="font-weight:bold"
| colspan="3" style="text-align:left;" | Total
| 
| 100%
|-
| colspan="5" style="background-color:#E9E9E9;"|
|- style="font-weight:bold"
| colspan="4" |Source:
|
|}

2003

|-
! colspan=2 style="background-color:#E9E9E9;text-align:left;vertical-align:top;" |Candidate
! style="background-color:#E9E9E9;text-align:left;vertical-align:top;" |Party
! style="background-color:#E9E9E9;text-align:right;" |Votes
! style="background-color:#E9E9E9;text-align:right;" |%
|-
|style="background-color:"|
|align=left|Vasily Galushkin (incumbent)
|align=left|United Russia
|
|39.54%
|-
|style="background-color:"|
|align=left|Mikhail Tarantsov
|align=left|Communist Party
|
|26.43%
|-
|style="background-color:#164C8C"|
|align=left|Andrey Gorbanov
|align=left|United Russian Party Rus'
|
|7.28%
|-
|style="background-color:"|
|align=left|Sergey Borisov
|align=left|Independent
|
|1.85%
|-
|style="background-color:#000000"|
|colspan=2 |against all
|
|21.53%
|-
| colspan="5" style="background-color:#E9E9E9;"|
|- style="font-weight:bold"
| colspan="3" style="text-align:left;" | Total
| 
| 100%
|-
| colspan="5" style="background-color:#E9E9E9;"|
|- style="font-weight:bold"
| colspan="4" |Source:
|
|}

2016

|-
! colspan=2 style="background-color:#E9E9E9;text-align:left;vertical-align:top;" |Candidate
! style="background-color:#E9E9E9;text-align:left;vertical-align:top;" |Party
! style="background-color:#E9E9E9;text-align:right;" |Votes
! style="background-color:#E9E9E9;text-align:right;" |%
|-
|style="background-color: " |
|align=left|Tatyana Tsybizova
|align=left|United Russia
|
|44.46%
|-
|style="background:"| 
|align=left|Dmitry Krylov
|align=left|Patriots of Russia
|
|13.66%
|-
|style="background-color:"|
|align=left|Aleksey Burov
|align=left|Communist Party
|
|12.52%
|-
|style="background-color:"|
|align=left|Oleg Orlov
|align=left|Liberal Democratic Party
|
|10.18%
|-
|style="background-color:"|
|align=left|Dmitry Kalashnikov
|align=left|A Just Russia
|
|10.18%
|-
|style="background:"| 
|align=left|Galina Boldyreva
|align=left|Yabloko
|
|3.76%
|-
|style="background:"| 
|align=left|Vadim Merkulov
|align=left|People's Freedom Party
|
|1.44%
|-
| colspan="5" style="background-color:#E9E9E9;"|
|- style="font-weight:bold"
| colspan="3" style="text-align:left;" | Total
| 
| 100%
|-
| colspan="5" style="background-color:#E9E9E9;"|
|- style="font-weight:bold"
| colspan="4" |Source:
|
|}

2021

|-
! colspan=2 style="background-color:#E9E9E9;text-align:left;vertical-align:top;" |Candidate
! style="background-color:#E9E9E9;text-align:left;vertical-align:top;" |Party
! style="background-color:#E9E9E9;text-align:right;" |Votes
! style="background-color:#E9E9E9;text-align:right;" |%
|-
|style="background-color: " |
|align=left|Andrey Gimbatov
|align=left|United Russia
|
|56.14%
|-
|style="background-color:"|
|align=left|Andrey Annenko
|align=left|Communist Party
|
|14.43%
|-
|style="background-color:"|
|align=left|Dmitry Kalashnikov
|align=left|A Just Russia — For Truth
|
|12.37%
|-
|style="background-color:"|
|align=left|Aleksandr Kuzmin
|align=left|Liberal Democratic Party
|
|6.42%
|-
|style="background-color: "|
|align=left|Stanislav Pluzhnikov
|align=left|Party of Pensioners
|
|2.33%
|-
|style="background-color: "|
|align=left|Sergey Lobov
|align=left|New People
|
|2.31%
|-
|style="background-color:"|
|align=left|Natalya Gromova
|align=left|The Greens
|
|2.22%
|-
|style="background-color:"|
|align=left|Aleksandr Klyuchnikov
|align=left|Rodina
|
|1.16%
|-
|style="background-color: "|
|align=left|Georgy Kozitsky
|align=left|Party of Growth
|
|0.64%
|-
| colspan="5" style="background-color:#E9E9E9;"|
|- style="font-weight:bold"
| colspan="3" style="text-align:left;" | Total
| 
| 100%
|-
| colspan="5" style="background-color:#E9E9E9;"|
|- style="font-weight:bold"
| colspan="4" |Source:
|
|}

Notes

References

Russian legislative constituencies
Politics of Volgograd Oblast